Alfred Thomas Papai (May 7, 1917 – September 7, 1995) was an American pitcher in Major League Baseball who played between the  and  seasons for the St. Louis Cardinals (1948, 1950), St. Louis Browns (1949), Boston Red Sox (1950) and Chicago White Sox (1955). He was born in Divernon, Illinois.

A knuckleballer specialist, Papai was one of 29 players to pitch for both St. Louis clubs. In his only major league full-season he went 4–11 with a 5.06 ERA for the helpless Browns. In parts of four seasons, he posted a 9–14 record with a 5.37 ERA in 88 appearances, including 18 stars, eight complete games, four saves, 70 strikeouts, 138 walks, and  innings of work.

Papai also enjoyed a brilliant minor league career as the pitching staff ace for the Houston Buffaloes of the Texas League, posting 20-win seasons for them (1947, 1951–53). He went 21–10, with a 2.45 ERA for the 1947 Dixie Series Champion Buffs and 23–9, with a 2.44 ERA for the 1951 Texas League kings. He also pitched in the Venezuelan Winter League during the 1951–52 and 1952–53 seasons, compiling a 15–16 mark with a 2.25 ERA in 47 appearances.

Papai died in Springfield, Illinois, at the age of 78.

See also

List of knuckleball pitchers

References

External links
, or Retrosheet

1917 births
1995 deaths
Allentown Cardinals players
Baseball players from Illinois
Boston Red Sox players
Chicago White Sox players
Corpus Christi Giants players
Houston Buffaloes players
Indianapolis Indians players
Knuckleball pitchers
Lynchburg Cardinals players
Major League Baseball pitchers
Memphis Chickasaws players
Oklahoma City Indians players
Patriotas de Venezuela players
Rochester Red Wings players
St. Louis Browns players
St. Louis Cardinals players
Springfield Cardinals players
Worthington Cardinals players
People from Sangamon County, Illinois